Little Dry Creek may refer to a waterway in the United States:

Little Dry Creek (California), in Yuba County
Little Dry Creek (Arapahoe County, Colorado)
Little Dry Creek (Westminster, Colorado)
Little Dry Creek (New Mexico)
Battle of Little Dry Creek, an engagement during Geronimo's War